The 14th BRDC International Trophy was a motor race, run for cars complying with the Formula One rules, held on 12 May 1962 at the Silverstone Circuit, England. The race was run over 52 laps of the Silverstone Grand Prix circuit, and was won by British driver Graham Hill in a BRM P57.

Results

References
 "The Grand Prix Who's Who", Steve Small, 1995.
 "The Formula One Record Book", John Thompson, 1974.

BRDC International Trophy
BRDC International Trophy
BRDC
BRDC International Trophy